Microlins is a Brazilian educational franchise chain, the second largest of its kind in the country, with almost 700 schools in more than 500 cities, and almost half a million students (data of June 2007). Founded in the city of Lins by young entrepreneur José Carlos Semenzato, Microlins started as a single small computer training school, in 1990. After a rapid expansion, with branches in several surrounding cities, the company transformed itself into a franchise chain and created many new courses.

Microlins belongs to a holding company, FranHolding, presided also by Semenzato, which owns also other franchise chains, such as Instituto Embelleze, NumberOne Idiomas, ProfSat, and others.

External links
 Official website

Education companies of Brazil
Companies based in São Paulo (state)
Franchises